Houston County Schools is the county government agency which operates the public schools in Houston County, Georgia, United States.

It is the only school district in the county.

List of schools

Elementary and primary schools 

Primary schools, such as David Perdue Primary in the following list, cater to grades Pre-K through 2nd, and usually function as adjuncts to the elementary schools of the same name (e.g. David Perdue Elementary).

Middle schools

High schools

References

External links

Education in Houston County, Georgia
School districts in Georgia (U.S. state)